Al Jabbar Grand Mosque is a mosque located in Bandung, West Java, Indonesia. Due to the fact that it is around by a reservoir, the mosque is sometimes referred to as the Al Jabbar Floating Mosque. The mosque is adjacent to Summarecon Bandung and is situated in the Gedebage district in eastern Bandung.

Al Jabbar, meaning great in Arabic, is one of the 99 names of Allah. Aljabar is the Indonesian word for algebra, which was founded by a muslim. Coincidentally, Jabar is also an acronym and nickname of the province of West Java.

History

Background
In the past, the Gedebage area was a swamp called Muras Geger Hanjuang. These swamps are the remnants of the Ancient Bandung Lake. At the end of the 19th century, these swamps began to dry up and become rice fields. The state railway company, Staatsspoorwegen (SS), built a railway connecting Bandung and Cicalengka in the middle of these swamps. Gedebage became a sub-district after the city of Bandung was divided in 2006. This expansion made this area lively because people started building new housing there.

Construction
Construction of the mosque started on 29, December, 2017. Ex-governor Ahmad Heryawan and ex-vice governor Deddy Mizwar performed the ground breaking ceremony and layed the first stone to officially begin construction of the mosque. Due to the COVID-19 pandemic, construction was halted in 2020 and was later resumed one and a half years later on 24 August 2021. After 5 years of construction, the mosque was officially inaugurated on 30 December 2022 by Governor Ridwan Kamil.

Specifications
The Mosque covers a total area of 21,799,20 square meters. It has a ground floor that covers an area of 11,238.20 square meters, the first floor has an area of 8,329 square meters, and the mezzanine floor has an area of 2,232 square meters. Meanwhile, the area devoted to lakes and reservoirs is 6,930 hectares, and the area devoted to parking lots, plazas, and green spaces is 11,163 hectares.

The prayer chambers can accommodate 9,822 people on the first floor, 3,188 on the mezzanine floor, 3,627 in the halls, and 16,363 on the courtyard. In total it can fit 33,000 people.

The mosque contains four 99-meter-tall minarets, one in each of its four corners. 6,136 sheets of glass are designed to mimic fish scales that make up the facade and dome. There are 27 entrances to the mosque, representing the 27 cities or regencies of West Java. On each of these entrances there is a batik motif which is native to each of the cities or regencies. Turkish-woven carpets are used for the floors of the mosque.

Given that the mosque is situated in the flood-prone district of Gedebage, it is surrounded by a 6.9 hectare reservoir that can absorb water during floods. The mosque has a garden and a museum dedicated to Islam.

Gallery

References

Mosques completed in 2022
Mosques in Bandung
Neo-futurism architecture